Johan Papegoja (died March 23, 1667) was a Swedish nobleman, soldier, and the fifth governor of the Swedish Colony of New Sweden.

Johan Papegoja had been one of the early Swedish settlers on the Delaware. Papegoja is the Swedish word for parrot. He served as a Lieutenant  at New Sweden under governor Johan Björnsson Printz.  During 1644, Johan Papegoja was married to Armegott Printz, the daughter of Governor Printz. The marriage was known to be an unhappy one. Papegoja himself made several voyages between Sweden and the Delaware River colony. He traveled back and forth during 1643 aboard the Fama, in 1647 on the Swan and during 1655 on board the Mercurius .

Papegoja was the acting governor of New Sweden from the time of the departure of Johan Björnsson Printz during October 1653 until the arrival of  Johan Classon Risingh during May 1654.  Subsequently, Papegoja was assigned the duty of sailing to Sweden to transfer additional settlers to the colony.  The Mercurius left Sweden during November 1655 and arrived in the Delaware River during March 1656. By the time the ship arrived, New Sweden had surrendered to the Dutch West India Company. In short time,  Johan Papegoja had a falling-out with the Dutch and departed for Sweden in 1656. Johan Papegoja is believed to have died at Ramstorp manor, Ångarp parish, Skaraborg, now in Västra Götaland, Sweden.

During 1662, Armegott Printz sold The Printzhof, an  estate which Governor Printz had owned. She received partial payment with the remainder payable later. However, subsequent payment was refused. She brought suit for the recovery of the island. Ten years later in 1672, Armegott Printz recovered the estate. She subsequently sold the property a second time and returned to Sweden. She died on November 25, 1695 at Läckö Castle (in Swedish: Läckö Slott).

References

Further reading
Ashmead,  Henry Graham  History of Delaware County, Pennsylvania (Philadelphia: L. H. Everts & Co. 1884)
Johnson, Amandus Swedish Settlements on the Delaware  (Philadelphia, PA: Swedish colonial Society. 1911)
Munroe, John A.  Colonial Delaware. (Delaware Heritage Press, Wilmington. 1977)
Weslager, C. A. New Sweden on the Delaware: 1638-1655 (Wilmington, DE: The Middle Atlantic Press, 1988).

External links
Founding of New Sweden

Governors of New Sweden
Swedish military officers
People of New Sweden
1667 deaths
Year of birth unknown